Andrzej Wasilewicz (10 March 1951 – 13 December 2016) was a Polish stage and film actor, and film director.

Wasilewicz was born in Białogard in 1951. In 1975, he graduated from PWST in Warsaw. His first major film role came in 1974—as Zenek, Ania's fiancé—in the film Nie ma mocnych. Since the 1980s he lived in the U.S. and studied at the Columbia University. Wasilewicz had suffered from Parkinson's disease and died from the disease on December 13, 2016, at a hospital on Long Island, New York. He was 65.

Filmography
Portfel (1970) (uncredited)
Niebieskie jak Morze Czarne (1971) as a table tennis umpire (uncredited)
Nie ma mocnych (1974) as Zenek
Trzecia granica (1975) as Andrzej Bukowian
Dziewczyna i chłopak (1977) as Tomek's coach
Kochaj albo rzuć (1977) as Zenek
Sprawa Gorgonowej (1977) as a police officer
Bilet powrotny (1978) as a wedding guest
Aria dla atlety (1979) as Abs
Racławice 1794 (1979)
Wolne chwile (1979) as Mikołaj
Najdłuższa wojna nowoczesnej Europy (1979–1981) as Hans
Miś (1980) as a son seeing his mother to the airport
Dom (TV series) (1980) as a steam locomotive worker
Wizja lokalna 1901 (1980) as teacher Gardo
Alicja (1982) as a gangster
Szczęśliwego Nowego Jorku (1997) as a "Klient" witch loppers

References

1951 births
2016 deaths
Polish film directors
Polish male film actors
Polish male stage actors
People from Białogard